Andrey Yakovlev may refer to:

 Andrei Yakovlev (born 1995), Russian footballer
 Andrey Yakovlev (tennis) (born 1992), Russian tennis player